Khwaja Abdul Hamied FCS, FRIC (31 October 1898 – 23 June 1972) was an Indian industrial and pharmaceutical chemist who founded Cipla, India's oldest pharmaceutical company in 1935. His son, Yusuf Hamied headed the company after him for the next 52 years.

Early life and background
Hamied was born in Aligarh, to Khwaja Abdul Ali, an advocate, and Masood Jahan Begum. Through his father, he was descended from the Sufi saint Khwaja Ahrar, while on his mother's side, he was descended from Shah Shuja, the last Durrani king of Afghanistan. His paternal great-uncle was the noted reformer Sayyid Ahmad Khan.

Education
After matriculating from Islamia High School, Etawah, distinguishing himself in mathematics, Hamied completed his Intermediate in Science from Agra College in 1917. Having decided to become a chemist, he then spent a year at a Madras trade school studying leather technology before enrolling at Muir Central College in Allahabad, from which he completed his B.Sc. in chemistry in 1920. While at the college, he became a favourite student of Nil Ratan Dhar, a distinguished inorganic chemist under whom he studied for a master's degree. 

He graduated from Allahabad University in Allahabad, Uttar Pradesh and held M.A. and PhD degrees from the Humboldt University of Berlin in Germany. He was a disciple of M.K. Gandhi and former founder professor along with Zakir Husain of the Jamia Milia Islamia in Aligarh, now based in Delhi.

Career
Hamied followed Mahatma Gandhi's Indian nationalism. Hamied's family raised money to send him to study chemistry in England, during British rule, in 1924. Instead, he changed ships and went to Germany, then the world's leader in chemicals. On a Berlin lake, he met a Lithuanian Jewish socialist, whom he married. They fled as the Nazis rose to power in Germany.

Chemical, Industrial and Pharmaceutical Laboratories (CIPLA) was founded in 1935 with an initial capital of Rs. 2 lakhs. The company commenced production in 1937 making it the oldest pharmaceutical company in India. His eldest son Yusuf Hamied, who did study chemistry in England, is now Chairman of Cipla. Yusuf still refers to his chemistry notebooks from Cambridge.

Apart from conceiving the idea of establishing a National Chemical Laboratory and making it a reality, Dr Khwaja Hamied floated the idea and conceptualized the establishment of the Council of Scientific and Industrial Research (CSIR) as an umbrella organization to run a clutch of laboratories. He remained a Member of the Governing Body of the CSIR right from its inception till the very last

During the last four decades of his life, he played an important role in raising the pharmaceutical and chemical industry standards in India to an extraordinarily high level through founding the firm Cipla.

Dr. Hamied was an honorary professor and a member of the executive council of the Aligarh Muslim University, member of the Senate of Bombay University and a fellow of the Royal Institute of Chemistry, UK. He was also a member of the Bombay Legislative Council from 1937 to 1962, refusing the offer of becoming a Muslim Minister in the cabinet in Bombay. Hamied also served as Sheriff of Bombay.

Dr Khwaja Abdul Hamied died in 1972 after a brief illness.

References

Khwaja Abdul Hamied : Father of indigenous modern pharmaceutical industry of India 

University of Allahabad alumni
Indian businesspeople in the pharmaceutical industry
Academic staff of Jamia Millia Islamia
20th-century Indian Muslims
Sheriffs of Mumbai
People from Kutch district
Businesspeople from Delhi
1898 births
1972 deaths
Humboldt University of Berlin alumni
People from Aligarh
Businesspeople from Uttar Pradesh